James Hampton  may refer to:

 James Hampton (priest) (1721–1778), English cleric known as the translator of the Ancient Greek historian Polybius
 James G. Hampton (1814–1861), member of the U.S. House of Representatives from New Jersey's 1st district
 James Hampton (artist) (1909–1964), American outsider artist
 James Hampton (actor) (1936–2021), American television and film actor